WVNW is a country music formatted radio station in the Lewistown, Pennsylvania market.  The station is owned by WVNW, Inc.

Personalities
Current air personalities include:
 'Insane' Erik Lane (Mornings - 6am until 10am)
 Kenzie McCarter (Middays - 10am until 3pm)
 Brett Thomas (Afternoons - 3pm until 7pm)
 Nights with Elaina (syndicated Evenings/Overnights)
 'Cool Hand' Luke  (Saturday 1-4 PM)

External links
Star Country 96.7

VNW
Country radio stations in the United States
Radio stations established in 1985
1985 establishments in Pennsylvania